17β-Dihydroequilin is a naturally occurring estrogen sex hormone found in horses as well as a medication. As the C3 sulfate ester sodium salt, it is a minor constituent (1.7%) of conjugated estrogens (CEEs; brand name Premarin). However, as equilin, with equilin sulfate being a major component of CEEs, is transformed into 17β-dihydroequilin in the body, analogously to the conversion of estrone into estradiol, 17β-dihydroequilin is, along with estradiol, the most important estrogen responsible for the effects of CEEs.

Pharmacology

Pharmacodynamics
17β-Dihydroequilin is an estrogen, or an agonist of the estrogen receptors (ERs), the ERα and ERβ. In terms of relative binding affinity for the ERs, 17β-dihydroequilin has about 113% and 108% of that of estradiol for the ERα and ERβ, respectively. 17β-Dihydroequilin has about 83% of the relative potency of CEEs in the vagina and 200% of the relative potency of CEEs in the uterus. Of the equine estrogens, it shows the highest estrogenic activity and greatest estrogenic potency.

Like CEEs as a whole, 17β-dihydroequilin has disproportionate effects in certain tissues such as the liver and uterus. Equilin, the second major component of conjugated estrogens after estrone, is reversibly transformed into 17β-dihydroequilin analogously to the transformation of estrone into estradiol. However, whereas the balance of mutual interconversion of estrone and estradiol is largely shifted in the direction of estrone, it is nearly equal in the case of equilin and 17β-dihydroequilin. As such, although 17β-dihydroequilin is only a minor constituent of CEEs, it is, along with estradiol, the most important estrogen relevant to the estrogenic activity of the medication.

Pharmacokinetics
17β-Dihydroequilin has about 30% of the relative binding affinity of testosterone for sex hormone-binding globulin (SHBG), relative to 50% for estradiol. The metabolic clearance rate of 17β-dihydroequilin is 1,250 L/day/m2, relative to 580 L/day/m2 for estradiol.

Chemistry

17β-Dihydroequilin, or simply β-dihydroequilin, also known as δ7-17β-estradiol or as 7-dehydro-17β-estradiol, as well as estra-1,3,5(10),7-tetraen-3,17β-diol, is a naturally occurring estrane steroid and an analogue of estradiol. In terms of chemical structure and pharmacology, equilin (δ7-estrone) is to 17β-dihydroequilin as estrone is to estradiol.

References

Secondary alcohols
Estranes
Estrogens
Human drug metabolites